The 1995 Arizona Wildcats softball team represented the University of Arizona in the 1995 NCAA Division I softball season.  The Wildcats were coached by Mike Candrea, who led his tenth season.  The Wildcats finished with a record of 66–6.  They competed in the Pacific-10 Conference, where they finished first with a 24–4 record.

The Wildcats were invited to the 1995 NCAA Division I softball tournament, where they swept the Regional and then completed a run to the title game of the Women's College World Series where they fell to champion UCLA.  The Bruins' participation and championship were later vacated by the NCAA.

Personnel

Roster

Coaches

Schedule

References

Arizona
Arizona Wildcats softball seasons
Arizona Softball
Pac-12 Conference softball champion seasons
Women's College World Series seasons